Podgrad is a settlement on the right bank of the Mura River in the foothills of Radgona Castle in the Municipality of Gornja Radgona in northeastern Slovenia.

References

External links
Podgrad on Geopedia

Populated places in the Municipality of Gornja Radgona